is a 2017 Japanese drama film directed by Daigo Matsui. The film featured as part of the Tokyo International Film Festival, and the Jeonju International Film Festival.

Plot  
The story centres on a director, who is pushing the cast of actors in rehearsal of a small town production of the British play "Morning" by Simon Stephens. The director pushes the actors to put as much as they can into the role. As such, the lines between the characters real dramas and the actors is blurred.

Cast 
Kokoro Morita as Kokoro
Reiko Tanaka as Reiko
Yuzu Aoki as Yuzu

References

External links 
  
 

2017 films
2010s Japanese-language films
Films directed by Daigo Matsui
Japanese drama films
2017 drama films
2010s Japanese films